The 1978 FIBA Europe Under-18 Championship was an international basketball  competition held in Italy in 1980.

Final ranking

1. 

2. 

3. 

4. 

5. 

6. 

7. 

8. 

9. 

10. 

11. 

12.

Awards

External links
FIBA Archive

Youth
FIBA
1978
FIBA U18 European Championship